The Velocity of Gary, also known as The Velocity of Gary* *(Not His Real Name), is a 1998 American drama film directed by Dan Ireland and written by James Still, based on his homonymous play. It stars Thomas Jane in the title role, along with Salma Hayek and Vincent D'Onofrio.

The film was screened at the 1998 San Sebastián International Film Festival, and was released in Los Angeles and New York City on July 16, 1999.

Plot summary 
Gary (not his real name, which is never revealed) is a hustler walking through the streets of New York City, looking for business. On the way, he saves Kid Joey, a young deaf transvestite who just arrived in New York, from a group of gay bashers, but he regrets it afterwards because Kid Joey becomes infatuated with Gary and follows him everywhere. Gary introduces him to his friends: Valentino, a former porn star, and Mary Carmen, a Mexican young woman who works as a doughnut shop waitress and is in love with Valentino, with whom she has been living for some time. Together they form a bohemian family, which includes Veronica, a still-active porn star, and Nat, a tattoo artist. Gary is also in love with Valentino, who is dying of AIDS. Through the stages of the disease, Mary Carmen and Gary argue over what kind of care he should be receiving, and who is going to supply that care. As Valentino draws near death, Mary Carmen finds out she is carrying Valentino's baby. The three take stock of themselves and their relationships with one another.

Cast

Reception
Review aggregation website Rotten Tomatoes gives the film a rating of 22% based on reviews from 18 critics.

Roger Ebert gave the film 2 out of 4 stars, saying "It's more fun to see conventional characters break the rules than for outlaws to follow them." He further commented, "there is never quite the feeling that these people occupy a real world; their colorful exteriors are like costumes, and inside are simply actors following instructions." TV Guide was more positive, writing "Once the noise dies down enough that you can concentrate on the characters, a nicely acted, three-way drama is allowed to emerge. Leads Jane, D'Onofrio and Hayek throw themselves fearlessly into their roles (perhaps a little well-placed trepidation might have quieted Hayek down a bit, but that's a relatively minor complaint), and have a series of genuinely touching scenes together." The review added "this doomed love story stands firmly in the tradition of Midnight Cowboy, driven by the corrosive effects of street life and the fragile alliances that protect down-and-outers against an uncaring world."

References

External links 
 
 
 

1998 films
1998 drama films
1998 independent films
1998 LGBT-related films
American LGBT-related films
American films based on plays
1990s English-language films
Films directed by Dan Ireland
Films set in New York City
Films shot in Los Angeles
HIV/AIDS in American films
Male bisexuality in film
LGBT-related drama films
Transgender-related films
1990s American films
English-language drama films